Thomas the Tank Engine Game is a board game published in 1986 by Waddingtons.

Contents
Thomas the Tank Engine Game is a game in which four engines start at the sheds and must get to the station around the various lines.

Reception
Charles Vasey reviewed Thomas the Tank Engine Game for Games International magazine, and gave it 4 stars out of 5, and stated that "Among its intended market the game is a great success but is too simple other than for tinkering with by older gamers. Although, having said that, I have noticed it is a popular game for visitors to take down and play about with. Four stars and no mistaking."

References

Board games introduced in 1986